Gardiner is a city in Kennebec County, Maine, United States. The population was 5,961 at the 2020 census. Popular with tourists, Gardiner is noted for its culture and old architecture. Gardiner is a nationally accredited Main Street America community. It is included in the Augusta, Maine micropolitan New England City and Town Area.

History

Located at the head of navigation on the Kennebec River, Gardiner was founded as Gardinerstown Plantation in 1754 by Dr. Silvester Gardiner, a prominent Boston physician. Dr. Gardiner had made a fortune as a drug merchant, with one apothecary shop in Massachusetts and two in Connecticut, and became a principal proprietor of the Kennebec Purchase within the old Plymouth Patent.

Dr. Gardiner induced a gristmill builder, saw millwright, house carpenter and wheelwright to settle here, as well as a man he enslaved named Isaac "Hazard" Stockbridge. Houses, mills, a church and a blockhouse were built. Situated at the confluence of the Kennebec River and Cobbosseecontee Stream, which has falls that drop 130 feet, the location was recognized by him as ideal for water-powered mills. Gardinerstown, set off from Pittston in 1760, became center of the regional economy.

The wilderness toils of Dr. Gardiner would end, however, with the Revolution. Loyal to the Crown, he fled Boston in 1776 when the British army evacuated. But his settlement lived on without him, and in 1803 was incorporated as the town of Gardiner. From the early 19th century until the Civil War, shipbuilding and trade were primary industries. It would become a city in 1849, at which time ten large riverfront wharves served shipping. Lumber, in vast quantities, passed 
through Gardiner. Tanneries and shoe factories prospered.

The city became known worldwide for exporting ice. Each winter men cut large blocks from the Kennebec River, then covered the ice with sawdust in warehouses to keep it frozen into summer. It was loaded year-round on large vessels for shipment throughout the United States and world. Gardiner was noted for its pristine Kennebec ice, harvested at the furthest point upriver that deep-draft vessels could reach.

In 1851, the city was connected by railroad. One of the first workable steam automobiles in America was built in Gardiner in 1858. Beginning in the 1860s, paper mills flourished, as did the commercial ice industry between the 1880s and 1920s. By the 1960s, however, many mills declined and closed, sending Gardiner's economy plummeting. The former mill town is now largely a bedroom community for people who work in Augusta, the state's capital, as well as Bath Iron Works in Bath. Some residents commute as far as the Portland area. The city is endowed with a great deal of antique architecture, much of it beautifully restored. In 1980, the entire downtown historic district became one of the National Register of Historic Places listings in Kennebec County, Maine.

Geography

Gardiner is located south of Augusta on the west side of the Kennebec River at the confluence of the Cobbesseeconte Stream. Randolph lies just across the river.

Climate
This climatic region is typified by large seasonal temperature differences, with warm to hot (and often humid) summers and cold (sometimes severely cold) winters.  According to the Köppen Climate Classification system, Gardiner has a humid continental climate, abbreviated "Dfb" on climate maps.

Demographics

2010 census
As of the census of 2010, there were 5,800 people, 2,487 households, and 1,550 families living in the city. The racial makeup of the city was 95.4% White, 0.3% African American, 0.7% Native American, 0.7% Asian, 0.4% from other races, and 2.5% from two or more races. Hispanic or Latino of any race were 1.0% of the population.

There were 2,487 households, of which 28.9% had children under the age of 18 living with them, 44.8% were married couples living together, 11.8% had a female householder with no husband present, 5.7% had a male householder with no wife present, and 37.7% were non-families. 29.6% of all households were made up of individuals, and 9.7% had someone living alone who was 65 years of age or older. The average household size was 2.30 and the average family size was 2.82.

The median age in the city was 40.9 years. 21.7% of residents were under the age of 18; 7.4% were between the ages of 18 and 24; 26.3% were from 25 to 44; 30.1% were from 45 to 64; and 14.4% were 65 years of age or older. The gender makeup of the city was 48.8% male and 51.2% female.

2000 census
As of the census of 2000, there were 6,198 people, 2,510 households, and 1,603 families living in the city. The racial makeup of the city was 99.90% White, 0.39% African American, 0.66% Native American, 0.35% Asian, 0.05% Pacific Islander, 0.24% from other races, and 1.40% from two or more races. Hispanic or Latino of any race were 0.81% of the population.

There were 2,510 households, out of which 32.5% had children under the age of 18 living with them, 49.1% were married couples living together, 10.6% had a female householder with no husband present, and 36.1% were non-families. 29.4% of all households were made up of individuals, and 10.9% had someone living alone who was 65 years of age or older. The average household size was 2.41 and the average family size was 2.97.

In the city, the population was spread out, with 24.8% under the age of 18, 7.7% from 18 to 24, 29.7% from 25 to 44, 24.2% from 45 to 64, and 13.6% who were 65 years of age or older. The median age was 38 years. For every 100 females, there were 93.0 males. For every 100 females age 18 and over, there were 87.7 males.

The median income for a household in the city was $35,103, and the median income for a family was $42,750. Males had a median income of $33,069 versus $25,399 for females. The per capita income for the city was $18,033. About 11.4% of families and 13.5% of the population were below the poverty line, including 17.2% of those under age 18 and 14.9% of those age 65 or over.

Education

Gardiner is part of Maine School Administrative District #11 that serves the communities of Gardiner, Pittston, Randolph and West Gardiner. The district operates five elementary schools, a middle school, and high school.
The following schools are located in Gardiner:
 Gardiner Area High School (9–12) 620 students
 Gardiner Regional Middle School (6–8) 421 students
 Laura E Richards School (Pre-K–2) 233 students
 River View Community School (3–5) 174 students

Government

Local government
Gardiner has a Mayor and council-manager system, with all governmental powers resting in a legislative body called a City Council. Voters elect a mayor, and seven council members, one for each of Gardiner's four districts and three at-large. The council appoints a city manager to handle the ordinary business of the city.

Political makeup
In the 2012 Presidential election, Barack Obama received 1,699 of the town's votes to Mitt Romney's 1,158. Political affiliation is roughly split into thirds between Democrats, Republicans, and Independents.

Voter registration

Sites of interest
 Christ Episcopal Church
 Edwin Arlington Robinson House
 Gardiner Heritage Museum
 Gardiner Historic District
 Gardiner Main Street
 Gardiner Public Library
 Gardiner Railroad Station
 Johnson Hall Performing Arts Center
 Kennebec River
 Laura Richards House

Notable people 

 Louis J. Brann, 56th Governor of Maine
 George Burgess, the first Episcopal bishop of Maine
 Henry Chadwick, journalist
 Charles R. Clason, U.S. Congressman
 Patrick Colwell, Speaker of the Maine House of Representatives
 Burton M. Cross, Maine's 61st and 63rd Governor
 Henry Dearborn,  physician, and a veteran of both the Revolutionary War and the War of 1812
 William Diamond, Maine State Senator
 Charles Dow, Maine legislator and businessman
 George Evans, U.S. Congressman and Senator
 Barzillai Gannett, U.S. Congressman
 Silvester Gardiner, physician and founder
 Robert Hallowell Gardiner, grandson of Silvester Gardiner and Gardiner's first mayor
 John W. Heselton, U.S. Congressman
 Horace A. Hildreth, ambassador and the 59th Governor of Maine
Henrietta Hooker, botanist and educator 
Julia Ward Howe, social activist and poet
 Edward Hunter, army officer
 George Kenney, World War II general
 John Hiram Lathrop, educator
 Earle McCormick, Maine State Senator
 Alton Morgan, Maine state legislator
 William Clark Noble, sculptor
 James Parker, U.S. Congressman
 George H. Ray, Speaker of the Wisconsin State Assembly
 Chester I. Reed, attorney/politician
 Laura E. Richards, author and poet
 Robert Hallowell Richards, mining engineer and metallurgist
 Edwin Arlington Robinson, poet
 Arthur Sager, track and field athlete
 George Plaisted Sanderson, Civil War veteran
 Isaac D. Seyburn, Civil War merchant captain
 Albert Spear, President of the Maine Senate
 John R. Swanton, anthropologist
 Dorothy Clarke Wilson, author
 William E. Wing, silent-film screenwriter
 Henry Aiken Worcester, 19th century minister

References

Further reading

External links

 City of Gardiner, Maine
 Gardiner Public Library
 Gardiner Main Street, A Main Street Maine Community
 Edwin Arlington Robinson, An American Poet, 1869–1935: A Virtual Tour of Robinson's Gardiner, Maine

 
Cities in Kennebec County, Maine
Cities in Maine
Populated places established in 1754
1754 establishments in Massachusetts